Cultural TV (KRT TV) is a Turkish nationwide TV channel established in 2005. It has a sister radio station, Karadeniz FM, launched in 1994.

It covered the 2013 protests in Turkey.

References

External links 

Television stations in Turkey
Television channels and stations established in 2005